John Albert Vasa (Jan Albert Waza) (25 June 1612 – 29 December 1634) was a Polish cardinal, and a Prince-Bishop of Warmia and Kraków. He was the son of Sigismund III Vasa and Constance of Austria.

Biography
John Albert Vasa was born in Warsaw in the Polish–Lithuanian Commonwealth. When he was 9 years old, after the death of Szymon Rudnicki his father chose him to be the next Prince-Bishop of Warmia. The pope agreed to that request on 21 October 1621. More difficult to reach was an agreement from the Warmian chapter, and the objections of szlachta delayed the final approval of this nomination in the Sejm until 1631. The prince never visited his diocese, it was governed in his name by the suffragan bishop Michał Działyński, archdeacon of Warsaw Jakub Wierzbipięta Borzuchowski and canon of Warmia, Paweł Piasecki. The cathedral at Frauenburg (Frombork) was enriched by the gifts from Jan Albert that included liturgical robes and a golden statue of Saint Andrew.

He was educated in the Society of Jesus.

On 20 November 1632 Vasa received the office of Prince Bishop of Cracow (after the death of Andrzej Lipski); he performed his duties in person from 27 February 1633.

On 20 December 1632 his cardinal nomination was declared in public; Pope Urban VIII signed the nomination on 19 October 1629 but in  secret (in pectore tacite), and after revealing the information he granted Jan Albert the presbyterian title of Sanctae Marie in Aquiro.

Jan Albert died in Italy in 1634 at Padua, where he was likely sent by his brother, King Wladislaw IV Waza with a diplomatic mission. The cause of his death is uncertain - Albrycht S. Radziwill in his diary suggested that he was infected with smallpox when he met his brother, Aleksander Karol during their meeting before he left for Italy (Karol died this same year from smallpox). Paweł Piasecki suggests that the cause of his death could be some illness other than smallpox.

In the office of Bishop of Warmia he was succeeded by Mikolaj Szyszkowski in 1632. In the office of Bishop of Kraków he was succeeded by Jakub Zadzik.

Ancestors

Gallery

See also
 Bishops of Warmia
 List of Roman Catholic bishops of Kraków

References

External links
 More info related to his Church Career

1612 births
1634 deaths
Ecclesiastical senators of the Polish–Lithuanian Commonwealth
Polish Prince Royals
Bishops of Warmia
17th-century Polish cardinals
Bishops of Kraków
John Albert
17th-century Roman Catholic bishops in the Polish–Lithuanian Commonwealth
Deaths from smallpox
Clergy from Warsaw
Burials at Wawel Cathedral
Sons of kings